Juan Lizardo Montero Flores (1832 in Piura, Peru – 1905) was a Peruvian soldier and politician who held the provisional Presidency of Peru from 1881 to 1883, replacing President Francisco García Calderón, during the Chilean occupation of Peru that took place as a result of the War of the Pacific. He was also Mayor of Lima for a brief period, in 1879.

Montero was a friend and comrade-in-arms of Miguel Grau, Manuel Ferreyros and Aurelio García y García, all of whom were known as the Four Aces of the Peruvian Navy.

Biography

Lizardo Montero joined the Peruvian Navy in the decade of 1850. Seven years later, aboard the frigate Apurímac, he supported Manuel Ignacio de Vivanco's coup. Between 1858 and 1862 he travelled to Spain.

In 1865, he supported General Mariano Ignacio Prado in his coup d'état against General Juan Antonio Pezet. He was then promoted to the rank of corvette captain and was in command of the Peruvian squad during the conflict with Spain in 1866.

In 1871, Montero was among the founders of the Civilista Party. He was chosen senator for his native Piura and, five years later, was promoted to the rank of admiral. After Prado's declaration of war, Montero Flores was named military and political chief of the southern Peruvian provinces.

After a brief defeat in a naval campaign, he left to Lima where he joined Nicolás de Piérola's forces. He fought in the War of the Pacific during battles of San Juan and of Miraflores in January 1881. After the occupation of Lima, he left to Huaraz as military and political chief of the northern provinces. In 1881 he was chosen as Francisco García Calderón first Vice President.

After the deportation of García Calderón, Montero was named Interim President and started the peace negotiations with the government of Chile. His refusal to cede any territory to Chile forced him to briefly move the Peruvian congress to Arequipa. Montero left the country after the Treaty of Ancón in 1883. In 1890, on his return to Peru, he was once again named senator for his native Piura.

See also 
 List of presidents of Peru

References

1832 births
1905 deaths
Peruvian Navy admirals
Presidents of Peru
Vice presidents of Peru
People of the Chincha Islands War
Peruvian military personnel of the War of the Pacific
Civilista Party politicians